Svensk Elektrobil AB (SEA) was a Swedish company that made electric vehicles. The Company was founded by Asea and was located at Rosenlundsgatan in southern Stockholm. The vehicle loaded 2.5 tonnes and had a top speed of 25 km/h.

Specification
The vehicle had an electric motor connected to Tudor batteries rated at 250 Ah. One of the models, the EV 12 launched in 1943, had a duo system with two motors. An extra motor could be connected when driving uphill or when heavily loaded. Most models had a range of 60–70 km, but 127 km was achieved.

History
Production of electric vehicles ended at the end of the 1940s due to competition from gasoline powered cars. In 1959 the company was renamed Svensk Reaktorteknik and later to ASEA-Atom and is as of 2009 named Westinghouse.

References 

Electric vehicles introduced in the 20th century
Defunct motor vehicle manufacturers of Sweden
Defunct companies of Sweden
ASEA